Beau Sabreur is a 1928 American silent romantic adventure film directed by John Waters and starring Gary Cooper and Evelyn Brent. Based on the 1926 novel Beau Sabreur by P. C. Wren, who also wrote the 1924 novel Beau Geste. Produced by Paramount Famous Lasky Corporation and distributed by Paramount Pictures, only a trailer exists of this film today. The released feature version is a lost film.

In the original novel the lead character Major Henri de Beaujolais is an officer of spahis (Algerian colonial cavalry of the French Army) and has no connection with the better known Foreign Legion. In all surviving stills of Beau Sabreur Gary Cooper is shown wearing the distinctive spahi uniform and it is not clear whether the lost film was intended to be a Foreign Legion epic.

Plot
A desert-bound member of the French Foreign Legion exposes a betrayer to the Legion. He is then sent on a mission among the Arabs to conclude the signing of a crucial peace treaty.

Cast
 Gary Cooper as Major Henri de Beaujolais
 Evelyn Brent as Mary Vanbrugh
 Noah Beery as Sheikh El Hammel
 William Powell as Becque
 Roscoe Karns as Buddy
 Mitchell Lewis as Suleman the Strong
 Arnold Kent as Raoul de Redon
 Raoul Paoli as Dufour
 Joan Standing as Maudie
 Frank Reicher as General de Beaujolais
 Oscar Smith as Djikki
 H.J. Utterhore (uncredited)
 Alberto Morin (uncredited)

Production
Beau Sabreur was filmed on location in Guadalupe, California, in Red Rock Canyon State Park in Cantil, California, and in Yuma, Arizona.

References

External links

Beau Sabreur at Virtual History

Beau Sabreur original novel at Project Gutenberg
Stills at silenthollywood.com

1928 films
1928 adventure films
1928 lost films
American silent feature films
American black-and-white films
Lost American films
Films directed by John Waters (director born 1893)
Films about the French Foreign Legion
Famous Players-Lasky films
Films produced by B. P. Schulberg
Films set in deserts
Films shot in Arizona
Films shot in California
American adventure films
American romance films
1920s American films
Silent adventure films